Nightmares Made Flesh is the second album by Swedish death metal band Bloodbath. It was released by Century Media Records on September 27, 2004. It was the band's only album to feature Peter Tägtgren on vocals (who was brought in to replace Mikael Åkerfeldt at the time), as well as the first to feature Opeth drummer Martin Axenrot to replace Dan Swanö as the drummer (with Swanö now playing guitar). This was Swanö's last album with Bloodbath.

The song "The Ascension" appeared on the two-part episode of Viva La Bam when the Margeras go to Europe.

Reception

Track listing

Credits 
Writing, performance and production credits are adapted from the album liner notes.

Personnel

Bloodbath 
 Peter Tägtgren – lead vocals
 Anders Nyström – guitar, bass, backing vocals
 Dan Swanö – guitar, bass, backing vocals
 Jonas Renkse – guitar, bass, backing vocals
 Martin Axenrot – drums

Session musician 
 Simon Solomon (ex-Witchcraft) – lead guitar

Production 
 Jens Bogren – production, engineering
 Bloodbath – production, engineering
 Henrik Jonsson – mastering

Visual art 
 Agni Kastner – art direction, design
 Andreas Hylthén – photography
 Wes Benscoter – cover

Studios 
 Fascination Street, Örebro, Sweden – recording, mixing (May 2004)
 Masters of Audio, Stockholm, Sweden – mastering

References

External links 
 
 Nightmares Made Flesh at Century Media

2004 albums
Albums produced by Jens Bogren
Albums with cover art by Wes Benscoter
Bloodbath albums
Century Media Records albums